Shropshire North may refer to:

 Shropshire North (UK Parliament constituency), now named North Shropshire
 North Shropshire, a former local government district in England